Symperasmus is a genus of beetles in the family Cerambycidae, containing the following species:

Symperasmus affinis (Thomson, 1865)
Symperasmus alboniger (Bates, 1861)
Symperasmus thoracicus (White, 1855)

References

Acanthoderini
Cerambycidae genera